The 1975 Ahearne Cup was the 23rd edition of the Ahearne Cup ice hockey tournament. Six teams participated in the tournament, which was won by HC Dynamo Moscow of the Soviet Union. It was held from December 26–30, 1974, in Stockholm, Sweden.

Results

External links
Tournament on hockeyarchives.info

1975
1974–75 in Soviet ice hockey
1974–75 in Swedish ice hockey
1974–75 in Czechoslovak ice hockey